Giovanni Tomasicchio (born 27 March 1982) is an Italian sprinter who won a gold medal with the Italian national relay team at the 2009 European Team Championships and also won one individual national title at the senior level.

Biography
Tomasicchio won a silver medal in the masters athletics, in 100 metres category M35, at the 2019 European Masters Athletics Championships held in Jesolo.

Achievements

National titles
Italian Athletics Indoor Championships
60 m: 2008

See also
 Italy national relay team

References

External links
 

1982 births
Living people
Italian male sprinters
Italian masters athletes
Athletics competitors of Centro Sportivo Aeronautica Militare
Sportspeople from Bari